"Take It on the Run" is a song by American rock band REO Speedwagon off the band's ninth studio album Hi Infidelity (1980). The song was written by lead guitarist Gary Richrath. "Take It on the Run" was the follow-up single behind the group's number-one hit, "Keep on Loving You". The single went gold on April 17, 1989. "Take It on the Run" has appeared on dozens of "various artists" compilation albums, as well as several REO Speedwagon greatest-hits albums. The 2017 song "Messin' Around" by Pitbull featuring Enrique Iglesias interpolates "Take It on the Run".

Background
According to REO Speedwagon lead singer Kevin Cronin, the original title to the song was "Don't Let Me Down."  Cronin said that:   

Cronin says that he insisted that the title should be "Take It on the Run" and that he added the line to the refrain "You’re under the gun / So you take it on the run," which he says "either makes sense or it doesn’t, but it sure sung well and it sure rhymed, and it was a spur-of-the-moment thing that when I heard the rest of the song, that’s what I felt." The official songwriting credit names Richrath as the sole writer, but the liner notes for Hi Infidelity credit Cronin for "lyrical assistance".

Record World described it as a "power ballad" and said it was a "blockbuster."

According to Cronin, Epic Records was not convinced that "Take It on the Run" was good enough to be released as the follow-up single to "Keep On Loving You" and wanted to release "In Your Letter" instead, but the band insisted on releasing "Take It on the Run." 

The song's music video was the ninth video played on MTV's first day, August 1, 1981. However, due to technical difficulties the video went to black just 12 seconds into the song, and never did finish.

Ultimate Classic Rock critic Matt Wardlaw rated it REO Speedwagon's all-time 2nd greatest song.

Personnel
REO Speedwagon
Kevin Cronin – lead and backing vocals, acoustic guitar
Gary Richrath – electric guitars
Bruce Hall – bass
Neal Doughty – synthesizers
Alan Gratzer – drums

Charts
It was released as a single in 1981 and reached number five on the Billboard Hot 100 chart. It also reached number 19 on the UK Singles Chart.

Weekly charts

Year-end charts

Certifications

Sources

1980 songs
1981 singles
REO Speedwagon songs
1980s ballads
Hard rock ballads
American pop rock songs
Songs about infidelity
Songs written by Gary Richrath
Epic Records singles
Song recordings produced by Kevin Beamish
Song recordings produced by Gary Richrath
Song recordings produced by Kevin Cronin